Benjamin Harris may refer to:
Benjamin Harris (publisher) (fl. 1673–1716), English publisher
Benjamin Gwinn Harris (1805–1895), U.S. Congress member
Benjamin Randell Harris (1781–?), British infantryman
Benjamin W. Harris (1823–1907), politician, lawyer and judge from Massachusetts
Benjamin Harris (New Zealand politician) (1836–1928), New Zealand politician  for Franklin

See also
Ben Harris (disambiguation)